The 2022 ITF World Tennis Tour Gran Canaria was a professional tennis tournament played on outdoor clay courts. It was the second edition of the tournament which was part of the 2022 ITF Women's World Tennis Tour. It took place in San Bartolomé de Tirajana, Spain between 1 and 7 August 2022.

Champions

Singles

  Arantxa Rus def.  Polina Kudermetova, 6–3, 3–6, 6–1

Doubles

  Jéssica Bouzas Maneiro /  Leyre Romero Gormaz def.  Lucía Cortez Llorca /  Rosa Vicens Mas, 1–6, 7–5, [10–6]

Singles main draw entrants

Seeds

 1 Rankings are as of 25 July 2022.

Other entrants
The following players received wildcards into the singles main draw:
  Noelia Bouzó Zanotti
  Xiomara Estévez Grillo
  Marta García Reboredo
  Olivia Gram
  Rosa Vicens Mas

The following players received entry into the singles main draw using a protected ranking:
  Maria Mateas

The following players received entry from the qualifying draw:
  Gloria Ceschi
  Chiara Girelli
  Marta González Encinas
  Lilly Elida Håseth
  Lia Karatancheva
  Claudia Sofía Martínez Solis
  Chantal Sauvant
  Maria Toma

References

External links
 2022 ITF World Tennis Tour Gran Canaria at ITFtennis.com
 Official website

2022 ITF Women's World Tennis Tour
2022 in Spanish tennis
August 2022 sports events in Spain